MV Thorsvoe is a Ro-Ro vehicle ferry operated by Orkney Ferries.

History
MV Thorsvoe was built by Campbeltown Shipyard in Campbeltown in 1991.

Service
MV Thorsvoe is kept as a relief vessel.

References

1991 ships
Transport in Orkney
Ferries of Scotland
Ships built on the River Mersey